Evans Adomako (born 6 September 1997) is a Ghanaian professional footballer who plays for Karela United.

Career
In 2017 he played for Gomel.

References

External links 
 

1997 births
Living people
Ghanaian footballers
Association football forwards
Ghanaian expatriate footballers
Ghanaian expatriate sportspeople in Belarus
Ghanaian expatriate sportspeople in Slovenia
Expatriate footballers in Belarus
Expatriate footballers in Slovenia
Belarusian Premier League players
Slovenian Second League players
FC Gomel players
NK Rudar Velenje players
Asante Kotoko S.C. players
Karela United FC players
NK Dravograd players